In mathematics, a microbundle is a generalization of the concept of vector bundle, introduced by the American mathematician John Milnor in 1964. It allows the creation of bundle-like objects in situations where they would not ordinarily be thought to exist. For example, the tangent bundle is defined for a smooth manifold but not a topological manifold; use of microbundles allows the definition of a topological tangent bundle.

Definition

In analogy with vector bundles, the integer  is also called the rank or the fibre dimension of the microbundle. Similarly, note that the first condition suggests  should be thought of as the zero section of a vector bundle, while the second mimics the local triviality condition on a bundle. An important distinction here is that "local triviality" for microbundles only holds near a neighborhood of the zero section. The space  could look very wild away from that neighborhood. Also, the maps gluing together locally trivial patches of the microbundle may only overlap the fibers.

The definition of microbundle can be adapted to other categories more general than the smooth one, such as that of piecewise linear manifolds, by replacing topological spaces and continuous maps by suitable objects and morphisms.

Examples 

 Any vector bundle  of rank  has an obvious underlying -microbundle, where  is the zero section.
Equivalently, it is the underlying microbundle of the trivial vector bundle of rank .
If  is a vector bundle, the pullback microbundle of its underlying microbundle is precisely the underlying microbundle of the standard pullback bundle.

Morphisms 

More generally, a morphism between microbundles consists of a germ of continuous maps  between neighbourhoods of the zero sections as above. 

An -microbundle is called trivial if it is isomorphic to the standard trivial microbundle of rank . The local triviality condition in the definition of microbundle can therefore be restated as follows: for every  there is a neighbourhood  such that the restriction  is trivial.

Analogously to parallelisable smooth manifolds, a topological manifold is called topologically parallelisable if its tangent microbundle is trivial.

Properties

A theorem of James Kister and Barry Mazur states that there is a neighborhood of the zero section which is actually a fiber bundle with fiber  and structure group , the group of homeomorphisms of  fixing the origin. This neighborhood is unique up to isotopy. Thus every microbundle can be refined to an actual fiber bundle in an essentially unique way.

Taking the fiber bundle contained in the tangent microbundle  gives the topological tangent bundle.

Microbundle theory is an integral part of the work of Robion Kirby and Laurent C. Siebenmann on smooth structures and PL structures on higher dimensional manifolds.

References

 
  See Chapter 14.

External links 
Microbundle at the Manifold Atlas.

Geometric topology
Algebraic topology